Saint-Jean-Baptiste Church, Église Saint-Jean-Baptiste, or variants thereof, may refer to:

Canada
Saint-Jean-Baptiste Church (Montreal), Montreal
Saint-Jean-Baptiste Church (Quebec City), Quebec City

France
Église Saint-Jean-Baptiste du Faubourg in Aix-en-Provence
Église Saint-Jean-Baptiste de Bastia in Bastia, Corsica
Église Saint-Jean-Baptiste de La Porta in La Porta, Corsica
Église Saint-Jean-Baptiste, Paris

United States
St. Jean Baptiste Roman Catholic Church, Upper East Side of Manhattan, New York City